Eresina corynetes is a butterfly in the family Lycaenidae. It is found in western Cameroon and Gabon. Its habitat consists of dense, primary forests.

References

Butterflies described in 1890
Poritiinae
Butterflies of Africa